Devin Lucien (born June 26, 1993) is an American football wide receiver for the BC Lions of the Canadian Football League (CFL). He played college football at UCLA before transferring as a graduate to Arizona State. He was drafted by the New England Patriots in the 7th round of the 2016 NFL Draft.

Professional career

New England Patriots
The New England Patriots selected Lucien in the seventh round (225th overall) of the 2016 NFL Draft. On September 3, 2016, he was released by the Patriots as part of final roster cuts and was signed to the practice squad the next day. After spending his entire rookie year on the practice squad, Lucien won his first Super Bowl when the Patriots defeated the Atlanta Falcons in Super Bowl LI by a score of 34–28 in overtime. On February 7, 2017, Lucien signed a futures contract with the Patriots.

On September 2, 2017, Lucien was waived/injured by the Patriots.

Indianapolis Colts
On September 12, 2017, Lucien was signed to the Indianapolis Colts' practice squad. On September 15, he was placed on the practice squad injured list. He was released on October 3, 2017.

Kansas City Chiefs
On November 7, 2017, Lucien was signed to the Kansas City Chiefs' practice squad. He was released on November 29, 2017.

Houston Texans
On December 5, 2017, Lucien was signed to the Houston Texans' practice squad, but was released one week later.

Tampa Bay Buccaneers
On December 20, 2017, Lucien was signed to the Tampa Bay Buccaneers practice squad. He signed a reserve/future contract with the Buccaneers on January 3, 2018. He was waived by the Buccaneers on May 13, 2018.

New England Patriots (second stint)
On July 23, 2018, Lucien signed with the New England Patriots. On August 31, 2018, Lucien was released as part of final roster cuts.

Memphis Express
Lucien signed with the Alliance of American Football and the Arizona Hotshots for the 2019 season, but was traded to the Memphis Express on January 26, 2019, in exchange for offensive guard Blake Muir. Lucien was placed on injured reserve on March 25. The league ceased operations in April 2019.

Winnipeg Blue Bombers
Lucien signed a futures contract for the 2020 CFL season with the Winnipeg Blue Bombers on November 13, 2019. He retired from professional football on May 12, 2020.

BC Lions 
On December 19, 2022, Lucien came out of retirement and signed with the BC Lions.

References

External links
Arizona State Sun Devils bio
UCLA Bruins bio

1993 births
Living people
Players of American football from Los Angeles
People from Encino, Los Angeles
American football wide receivers
UCLA Bruins football players
Arizona State Sun Devils football players
New England Patriots players
Indianapolis Colts players
Kansas City Chiefs players
Houston Texans players
Tampa Bay Buccaneers players
Arizona Hotshots players
Memphis Express (American football) players
Winnipeg Blue Bombers players